Idiomyces is a genus of fungi in the family Laboulbeniaceae. A monotypic genus, it contains the single species Idiomyces peyritschii.

References

External links
Idiomyces at Index Fungorum

Laboulbeniaceae
Monotypic Laboulbeniomycetes genera
Laboulbeniales genera